The early 1990s marked the advent of online diary planners. On the face of it, it seems that people who must attend countless meetings are the ones who need online diary planners the most. However, actual trends show that those who are in the habit of recording and chronicling their activities all the time are the real takers and users of online diary planners. Such people may be executives, event managers, doctors, students, and people from various walks of life. Terminally ill patients have often taken to writing online diaries. Through the medium of such online diaries, they have kept millions of others in the know of their personal plans, thoughts, their medical treatment procedures, etc. Since all sorts of people have been using online diary planners since their advent in the 1990s, the demand for perfect online organizers and personal information managers (PIMS) has been growing steadily with time. Initially, web-based Filofax came into being to satisfy the organizing need of users. But such applications had their disadvantages. This forced users to turn to solutions like ACT!, Time and Chaos. As these too did not prove to be adequate, those in need of online diary planners started looking towards Microsoft Outlook.

Online calendars: Upgraded online diary planners
Online calendars, a newer and upgraded version of online diary planners, soon appeared to replace the older online diary planners. The main difference between the newer online calendars and the older handheld computers and PIMS was that while the older devices stored all the appointments and meeting schedules of a person on their computer or handheld device, the newer calendar devices stored all information on the Internet. Hence, online calendars were automatically more accessible and less cumbersome as they could be accessed anytime, anywhere if users were in front of a PC, laptop or other machine connected to the Internet. Users did not need to carry them around as they had to carry the older versions because the older versions were not available on the Internet. Hence, diarists turned to Outlook. Right through the first half of the first decade of the 21st century, Outlook was considered to be an excellent application that could be synchronized with Pocket PCs. Further, the older versions required users to make backups of their data regularly, so they had to do that extra work. If they did not make a backup and their Psion, Palm or Pocket PC or other device crashed, they would be unable to recover any data. And if they did recover some data from the backup, to where would they restore it? To another Psion palmtop? Psion soon stopped producing palmtops.

First generation online calendars
However, some of the very first online calendars that were developed did not perform too well as online diary planners. Though they were impressive enough initially with their multifaceted social networking abilities, they could not manage to impress their users over a long period of time. They helped users to add appointments straightaway. Users did not need to sort through dropdown menus to choose meeting dates and times. That way, the online calendars functioned like secretaries. Users just had to key their meeting schedules into the application and the online diary planner would flash the data and remind them in time. But users soon began to be put off with these first-generation online calendars. They complained that they could view only one-month's appointments on the calendar. Which means if they wanted to schedule a conference over one month away, they would be unable to do so because the application allowed viewing a calendar only 30 days at a time. Also, if users set a meeting date that was far in the future, months from the date on which the details were entered, the online calendar would not show the details until and unless that month arrived. This disadvantage of the initially launched online calendars became a bane for most users. Then, there was the privacy issue. Such open calendars that intended users to connect with as many people as they could meant that others would be able to view the users’ calendars. Moreover, these online diary planners were unable to warn their users if more than one appointment was made within the same time slot. In other words, they could not prevent double bookings. Further, many people found the idea of an online calendar weird because they felt that it is impossible to access the Internet everywhere! Most first-generation online calendars could not carve out a decent market for themselves and thus had to give way to calendars created by giants of the information technology industry such as Microsoft and Yahoo!. To add insult to injury, users also disliked the appearance and the look and feel of first-generation online calendars.

Microsoft Outlook and Yahoo! Calendar
However these shortcomings of the first-generation online calendars prompted most users to go back to tried and tested ways. So people began to use Microsoft Outlook and synchronize the same with portable contrivances. However, this concept did not work with everybody. The Outlook applications on PCs, Palm handheld computers, Psion palm tops or diaries on cell phones that had been around for quite some time could not, however, meet the expectations of users. Despite helping users to automate the conference management process to some extent, these contrivances lacked the ability to guard against the common problem of double-booking appointments and meetings. So the Yahoo! Calendar was visited once again. Yahoo! was popular from the last decade of the 20th century. Yahoo! always came with downloadable and compatible software that helped to keep the office computer, the Yahoo! calendar and the handheld online diary working in tandem. Yahoo enables synchronization with Lotus Organizer, Outlook, ACT, Outlook Express and Palm.

But there was one hitch. The Yahoo! software had to be downloaded to the office PC if a user wanted to use it from their office. But downloading software from the Internet is discouraged and proscribed by many companies. Which meant that users could not use the Yahoo! calendar in many offices, but could use it in some. This is why the calendar began to experience a drop in popularity. This, and the Yahoo! design being not particularly eye-catching and that it did not work easily with all browsers, are the chief reasons why the Yahoo! calendar could not hold onto its number one position as the best and most user-friendly online calendar and diary planner.

Google Calendar
Google Calendar launched with a mix of unique and existing features.

Users can synchronize their calendar with Microsoft Outlook, making use of the conventional meeting request procedure found in other calendaring systems. When accepted, the proposed date will show on the recipient's Google Calendar. A reminder for the event can be sent to the involved parties' Gmail account before the event begins.

Google Calendar sends meeting alerts as SMS to users' cell phones and smartphones via the official apps.

Users are also able to download public holidays and important dates from the public calendar gallery. Google Calendar permits users to drag and drop events and happenings from one calendar, such as Microsoft Outlook, to another.

However, Google Calendar has several flaws. Firstly, to use it, users must have an active Google account. Secondly, the calendar may, at times, double-book users.

Other online diary planners and calendars
Currently, the Internet is flooded with electronic diaries and online diary planners of various types and with various abilities. Myriads of online calendars, which target different people with different interests, have developed over the last couple of years. Some of these online calendars and online diary planners are AirSet, Meeting Diary, and Mypunchbowl. AirSet is a multipurpose online diary planner that allows connecting with colleagues, friends and family. Mypunchbowl is basically a party and wedding planner. Meeting Diary is an online diary planner for planning meetings, conferences and events. As the goal of every online diary planner is to help people plan for specific occasions and needs, we can easily classify online diary planners as online diary planners for parties, online diary planners for families and friends, online diary planners for meetings, conferences and events, personal online diary planners, online diary planners for trips and special-interest online diary planners.

Online diary planners for offices and teams
DayViewer.com An online calendar based diary planner enables task & time management in one. The Team Pages area are designed for teams and offices to help with team collaboration, improve productivity & team coordination, and to alleviate communication issues by providing a discussion area for the team. DayViewer is built with reactive web technology meaning that the pages are updated without the need to refresh the screen.

Online diary planners for small businesses
DiaryBooker.com is designed for managing appointments for small businesses such as hairdressers, beauticians, dentists, golf professionals, personal trainers, yoga instructors etc. At its most basic level the concept is that the business owner can book the appointments or allow the customers to book their own appointments via the web based interface. The customer will get an SMS reminder before the appointment and the business owner can keep an eye on the appointments from any internet enabled device.

Online diary planners for parties
Mypunchbowl, Purpletrail, Bestpartyever, and Partypotato are some online diary planners that serve as party planners. Mypunchbowl also employs the services of experts who advise people on party and wedding planning.

Online diary planners for families and friends
Cozi.com and AirSet are excellent online diary planners for connecting with family members.

Online diary planners for meetings, conferences and events
Meeting Diary, MeetingWizard, etc. are some popular online diary planners which are frequently used when planning meetings, conferences and events.

Meeting Diary
Meeting Diary's a unique online diary planner that manages meetings for users. It is a very smart innovation that redefines the meeting management process. It not only allows users to schedule meetings, it also allows them to be in possession of a lot of meeting-related information. Meeting Diary has a huge data storage capacity and is capable of storing every kind of meeting-related information in it. It is an extremely secure web-based application. Users' information remains absolutely confidential in the application and totally inaccessible to unauthorized people. Meeting Diary is a platform that enables managers to organize meetings and conferences swiftly and seamlessly.

Meeting Wizard
Meeting Wizard is meeting scheduling software that helps perform the meeting scheduling process smoothly. It allows importing emails and works across different time zones. Meeting Wizard's a meeting scheduling software that comes free of cost.

Personal online diary planners
Diary.com, My Personal Diary, The Journal, and rememberthemilk.com are online diary planners that are used for personal planning and organizing. Diary.com is both a private and a public platform, which is simultaneously extremely personal as well as shareable.

Online diary planners for trips and holidays
Meet Me In, Triporama, Priceline.com, Tripit, Triphobo.com, Hilton e-Events, Groople, Trip Planner, Hotel Planner, TripHub, and GroupAbout are some of the most famous online diary planners that help users to plan trips and holidays. CarnivalConnections.com, InterContinental Hotels Group and Carlson Hotels Worldwide help travel groups by providing them with customized websites.

Triphobo.com, Groople and GroupAbout and most other online travel planners provide information on hotel bookings, sightseeing, leisure sports and activities, transportation and travel packages. Groople and GroupAbout have devised easy methods by which travel groups can build their own websites so that the websites address each travel group's own peculiar needs. Through these tailor-made websites, travel groups can link up with each other to share travel tips. Groople and GroupAbout have liaisons with various travel agencies and companies so that they can offer value-for-money and high-end travel and tour services to their users. Groople has liaisons with Kayak.com, Travelocity and SideStep and GroupAbout has liaisons with Orbitz and SideStep.

Hotel Planner is an online travel planner. The site allows travelers to name the place they wish to travel to as well as to announce their other travel wishes. All such information is recorded on the site. Hotel Planner then asks most of the hotels of that particular place to give quotations for room and other charges, online. If the travel group agrees to a particular quotation, Hotel Planner designs a tailor-made website for the travelers so that the travelers can book the hotel rooms online.

Priceline.com is another online diary planner that helps travelers plan for their trips smoothly. Travel groups of five to nine can book accommodation by sending their quotations or by agreeing straightaway to posted rates. However, if there are ten or more than ten travelers in the group, Priceline recommends them to ask the hotels directly for quotations.

Meet Me in allows travel groups with a maximum number of four travelers to travel from two different places, get together at one place and avail of a discounted travel package.

e-Events of Hilton Hotels permits travel groups to see the prices of rooms, book rooms and conference halls and construct a tailor-made site for themselves.

TripHub has liaisons with Alaska Airlines and Orbitz. When travelers approach TripHub, the site recommends the names of travel companies and agencies that would meet the requirements of the travelers and would address the travelers' specific travel needs.

Triporama allows tourists to interact with one another and discuss tour itineraries so that members of a travel group can arrive at a consensus when finalizing travel plans. Triporama also connects travelers to the web portals of travel companies such as Cruiseshipcenters international that promote package tours on Triporama.

Trip Planner enables travelers to get an accurate travel plan. Trip Planner permits users to specify their starting and ending spots and tentative departure and arrival times. In association with New York City Transit Authority, Trip Planner aims to provide detailed and comprehensive travel itineraries to the travelers who avail of its services.

Online travel planners have also been developed by hoteliers and sightseeing agencies. CarnivalConnections.com, a website that belongs to Carnival Cruise Lines, was developed to aid travel groups plan their tours. InterContinental Hotels Group and Carlson Hotels Worldwide provide travel groups with tailor-made websites so that travelers can book rooms and pay for the same over the Internet.

However, many opine that booking trips via online travel planners may not be the best way of booking trips. Larger groups are bound to get better discounts if they do not restrict themselves to the Internet, i.e., booking trips on a face-to-face basis or through travel agencies might be more lucrative for larger travel groups.

Special interest online diary planners
Marco software is an online diary planner that targets wine fans, gardeners and photographers.

References

Calendaring software